The 2nd Daily Mail Trophy was a non-championship motor race held for Formula One and Formula Two cars at Boreham Circuit on 2 August 1952. The race was won by Luigi Villoresi in a Ferrari 375, who also set pole and fastest lap. Chico Landi was second in another 375 and Mike Hawthorn was third in a Cooper T20-Bristol, and highest place Formula Two entrant.

After being run for two years in succession, the 3rd Daily Mail Trophy race would not be held until 1984.

Results

References

Daily Mail Trophy
Daily Mail Trophy
Daily Mail Trophy
Daily Mail Trophy